Justin Matamua (born 27 May 2003) is an Australian rugby league footballer who plays as a  forward for the Wests Tigers in the NRL.

Background
Matamua played his junior rugby league for the Campbelltown City Kangaroos.

Career

2022
Matamua made his first grade debut for the Wests Tigers against the Parramatta Eels in round 17 of the 2022 NRL season.  Matamua was sent to the sin bin five minutes into his debut for an illegal shoulder charge on Parramatta's Mitchell Moses during the clubs 28-20 defeat. On November 23rd, Matamua was announced to join the Wests Tigers Top-30 playing roster and extended his contract with the club until the end of 2025.

References

External links
 Tigers profile

2003 births
Living people
Australian people of Niuean descent
Australian people of Tokelauan descent
Australian sportspeople of Samoan descent
Australian rugby league players
Rugby league players from Sydney
Rugby league props
Wests Tigers players
Western Suburbs Magpies NSW Cup players